Pa Baz (also Romanized as Pā Bāz; also known as Pā Bār and Pā yi Bāz) is a village in Ghazali Rural District, Miyan Jolgeh District, Nishapur County, Razavi Khorasan Province, Iran. At the 2006 census, its population was 146, in 33 families.

References 

Populated places in Nishapur County